Rubus glaucifolius is a North American species of wild raspberry known by the common name San Diego raspberry. It is native to Oregon and California, where it grows in mountain forests.

Rubus glaucifolius is a tangling shrub with very slender, lightly prickly stem spreading and branching outward. The leaves are each made up of usually three lobed, toothed leaflets, sometimes five. Each leaflet is veined and wrinkly in texture, white on the underside because of a waxy coating along the surface, and up to 5 centimeters (2 inches) long. The inflorescence is a solitary flower or an array of a few flowers with five reflexed sepals and five white petals each about half a centimeter long. The fruit is a lightly hairy red raspberry.

References

External links
 
 
 Jepson Manual Treatment - Rubus glaucifolius

glaucifolius
Flora of California
Flora of Oregon
Endemic flora of the United States
Plants described in 1873
Taxa named by Edward Lee Greene
Taxa named by Albert Kellogg
Flora without expected TNC conservation status